Herazo is a surname. Notable people with the surname include:

Cristina Herazo (born 1952), American nurse and former actress
Héctor Rojas Herazo (1920–2002), Colombian novelist, poet, journalist and painter
María Fernanda Herazo (born 1997), Colombian tennis player
Victoria Herazo (born 1959), American racewalker